Andrew of Hungary may refer to:

Andrew I of Hungary, reign 1046–1060
Andrew II of Hungary, reign 1205–1235
Andrew III of Hungary, reign 1290–1301
Andrew of Hungary, Prince of Halych (died 1233/4)
Andrew of Hungary (historian) (fl. 1270)
Andrew, Duke of Calabria (1327–1345), Hungarian prince murdered by order of his wife Joanna I of Naples